The 2019 WGC-FedEx St. Jude Invitational was a professional golf tournament held July  at TPC Southwind in Memphis, Tennessee. It was the 21st WGC Invitational tournament, and the third of the World Golf Championships events in 2019. It was the first time the event had been held in Tennessee, having previously been based at Firestone Country Club in Ohio.

World number one, Brooks Koepka, completed a three-stroke victory over Webb Simpson to win his first World Golf Championship event. Koepka had begun the final day one shot behind Rory McIlroy, who led the field. With the win, Koepka earned more PGA Tour regular season FedEx Cup points than any other player and won first-place prize of $2 million in the Wyndham Rewards Top 10.

Venue

Course layout 
TPC Southwind was designed by Ron Prichard, in consultation with tour pros Hubert Green and Fuzzy Zoeller. TPC Southwind opened  in 1988, and is a member of the Tournament Players Club network operated by the PGA Tour.

Field 
The field consisted of players drawn primarily from the Official World Golf Ranking and the winners of the worldwide tournaments with the strongest fields.

1. Playing members of the 2018 United States and European Ryder Cup teams.
Paul Casey (2,3,4), Bryson DeChambeau (2,3,4), Tony Finau (2,3), Tommy Fleetwood (2,3), Sergio García (2,3), Tyrrell Hatton (2,3), Dustin Johnson (2,3,4), Brooks Koepka (2,3,4), Rory McIlroy (2,3,4), Phil Mickelson (2,3,4), Alex Norén (2,3), Thorbjørn Olesen, Ian Poulter (2,3), Jon Rahm (2,3,4), Patrick Reed (2,3), Justin Rose (2,3,4), Webb Simpson (2,3), Jordan Spieth (2,3), Henrik Stenson (2,3), Justin Thomas (2,3,4), Bubba Watson (2,3)
Rickie Fowler (2,3,4), Francesco Molinari (2,3,4), and Tiger Woods (2,3,4) did not play.

2. The top 50 players from the Official World Golf Ranking as of July 15, 2019.
Keegan Bradley (3,4), Rafa Cabrera-Bello (3), Patrick Cantlay (3,4), Jason Day (3), Matt Fitzpatrick (3), Jim Furyk (3), Justin Harding, Billy Horschel (3), Kevin Kisner (3,4), Matt Kuchar (3,4), Marc Leishman (3,4), Li Haotong (3), Hideki Matsuyama (3), Kevin Na (3,4), Louis Oosthuizen (3), Pan Cheng-tsung (3,4), Eddie Pepperell (3,4), Andrew Putnam (3), Chez Reavie (3,4), Xander Schauffele (3,4), Adam Scott (3), Cameron Smith (3,5), Brandt Snedeker (3,4), Matt Wallace (3), Gary Woodland (3,4)
Shane Lowry (3,4) and Bernd Wiesberger (3,4) did not play.

3. The top 50 players from the Official World Golf Ranking as of July 22, 2019.
Lucas Bjerregaard (4)

4. Tournament winners, whose victories are considered official, of tournaments from the Federation Tours since the prior season's WGC Invitational with an Official World Golf Ranking Strength of Field Rating of 115 points or more.'Corey Conners, J. B. Holmes, Max Homa, Kodai Ichihara, Kang Sung-hoon, Nate Lashley, Adam Long, Keith Mitchell, Aaron Rai, Kevin Tway, Danny Willett, Matthew WolffLee Westwood did not play.5. The winner of selected tournaments from each of the following tours
 Asian Tour: Indonesian Masters (2018)  – Poom Saksansin
 PGA Tour of Australasia: Australian PGA Championship (2018) – Cameron Smith, also qualified under categories 2 and 3
 Japan Golf Tour: Bridgestone Open (2018) – Shugo Imahira
 Japan Golf Tour: Japan Golf Tour Championship (2019) – Mikumu Horikawa
 Sunshine Tour: Dimension Data Pro-Am (2019) – Philip Eriksson

Nationalities in the field

 Round summaries 
 First round Thursday, July 25, 2019 Second round Friday, July 26, 2019 Third round Saturday, July, 27, 2019 Final round Sunday, July 28, 2019Final leaderboard

ScorecardCumulative tournament scores, relative to par''

References

External links 
 
 Coverage on European Tour's official site
 TPC Southwind

WGC Invitational
WGC-Bridgestone Invitational
WGC-Bridgestone Invitational
WGC-Bridgestone Invitational
WGC-Bridgestone Invitational